Joseph ("Joe") Nathaniel DeLoach (born June 5, 1967) is a former American sprinter; the 1988 Olympic champion in the 200 m.

Born in Bay City, Texas into a family with 11 sisters and one brother, DeLoach enjoyed running at a young age and desired to become a football player, but later set his mind to sprinting. He trained at the University of Houston, like Carl Lewis before him.

During his career, DeLoach took part in one Olympiad, the 1988 Summer Olympics. He won the 200 m (beating his teammate from the Santa Monica Track Club, Carl Lewis, while placing fifth in the 100 m). The first performance was enough to qualify for the Games. There, he and Lewis were the favorites. In the final, DeLoach caught Lewis and finished in the Olympic record time of 19.75. This performance marked the only time Carl Lewis was defeated in an individual Olympic final.

In 2003, Dr. Wade Exum, the United States Olympic Committee's director of drug control administration from 1991 to 2000, gave copies of documents to Sports Illustrated which revealed that some 100 American athletes, including DeLoach, had tested positive for drugs between 1988 and 2000. The IAAF investigated the allegations, and announced that the dosages were in low concentration and no rules had been broken.

References

External links

1967 births
Living people
American male sprinters
Athletes (track and field) at the 1988 Summer Olympics
Track and field athletes from Texas
People from Bay City, Texas
Houston Cougars men's track and field athletes
Medalists at the 1988 Summer Olympics
Olympic gold medalists for the United States in track and field